Button Moon is a British children's television programme broadcast in the United Kingdom in the 1980s on the ITV network. Thames Television produced each episode, which lasted ten minutes and featured the adventures of Mr. Spoon who, in each episode, travels to Button Moon in his homemade rocket ship. All the characters are based on kitchen utensils, as are many of the props.

Once on Button Moon, which hangs in "blanket sky", they have an adventure, and look through Mr. Spoon's telescope at someone else such as The Tortoise and the Hare, before heading back to their home on 'Junk Planet'. Episodes also include Mr. Spoon's wife Mrs. Spoon, their daughter, Tina Tea-Spoon and her friend Eggbert. The series ended in 1988 after 91 episodes.

Production
Button Moon was originally conceived by Ian Allen as a stage show for Playboard Puppets in 1978. Two years later, Allen was approached by the producers of popular Thames Television children's series Rainbow, who were looking to introduce new recurring story features for the programme - a search that also resulted in Cockleshell Bay stories also being incorporated into episodes before being spun off into its own series - and were interested in incorporating stories revolving around the Button Moon premise as a recurring feature in the series. However, through these initial meetings, it was quickly felt that there was enough potential for Button Moon to instead be launched as its own TV series for Thames. Following a successful pilot - which would go on to be broadcast as the first regular episode - the first series of thirteen programmes was transmitted in 1980. A further six series of thirteen programmes followed, making a total of ninety-one different Button Moon adventures. The series was repeated on a yearly basis for Thames TV up until 1988. All 91 episodes have been shown on satellite channel UK Gold since spring 1993. Every episode was at least 10 minutes.

Narration was by Robin Parkinson. Puppeteers included Ian Allen, John Thirtle, Francis Wright, Alistair Fullarton, Robin Stevens, Sue Dacre, Chris Leith, Judith Bucklow, Ian Brown, Rhiann West, Tony Holtham and others. The incidental music for the series was written by Peter Goslin. The show's theme tune was composed and performed by Peter Davison and  Sandra Dickinson, who were married at the time.

A live stage show toured England in the late 1980s and througout 1990s.

Litigation 
The creator of the show successfully sued the manufacturer of lookalike memorabilia Mr Robert Redshaw of Kapow gifts, in 2013.

This case was featured on an episode of The Sheriffs Are Coming on BBC One.

Episode list

Series 1 (1980-1981)

Series 2 (1981-1982)

Series 3 (1983)

Series 4 (1985)

Series 5 (1986)

Series 6 (1987)

Series 7 (1988)

VHS and DVD releases

DVD
Button Moon - Boat Race was released on 6 July 2009 in the UK. It comprised 10 episodes.

Button Moon - Talent Show was released in 2010 in the UK. It Comprised 3 episodes which are: Button Moon Talent Show, Dolly Teapot and The Fox and Hen.

(Series 1): The Good Luck Bird; The Persian Market; Barn Dance; Music in the Air; Cinders and the Magic Beans

(Other series): Button Hole Pond; Cows on Button Moon; Buttonhole Pond; Boat Race; and Buttonhole Pond

(iTunes): Season 6 of Button Moon can now be purchased on iTunes UK.

Broadcast History
In the United Kingdom, the series was first broadcast on ITV on terrestrial television. Years later it was repeated on satellite and cable television and was shown on various television networks including The Children's Channel, Nick Jr. and Nick Jr. Classics.
In New Zealand, the series was broadcast on TVNZ 1 and TVNZ 2. 
In Singapore, the series was broadcast on Mediacorp Channel 5 and Mediacorp Channel 8.
In Spain, the series was broadcast on Telemundo.
In Germany, the series with its English voiceovers was broadcast on the BFBS as well as its former network known as SSVC Television. It was also on SSVC Television and the BFBS in other countries including Falkland Islands, Cyprus, Gibraltar, Belize and Bosnia as well on satellite television in the United Kingdom which was the series' homeland.
In Zimbabwe, the series was broadcast on ZBC.
In Kenya, the series was broadcast on VOK (now KBC since 1989).
In Hong Kong, the series was broadcast on TVB.
In Iceland, the series was broadcast on BBC Prime with its original English language. The channel not only aired just works from the BBC but also programmes from Thames Television's catalogue including the series.

References

External links
Button Moon at Toonhound.com
Character list

1980s British children's television series
1980 British television series debuts
1988 British television series endings
ITV children's television shows
British children's adventure television series
British television shows featuring puppetry
Television series by FremantleMedia Kids & Family
Television shows produced by Thames Television
Television series set on fictional moons
Space adventure television series
English-language television shows